The Fussball Club Basel 1893 1988–89 season was their 95th season since the club's foundation. Charles Röthlisberger was the club's chairman, in the club's history he was their 31st chairman and this was his second year in this position. FC Basel played their home games in the St. Jakob Stadium. Following their relegation the season before this was their first season in the second tier of Swiss football since the 1945–46 season.

Overview

Pre-season
Following their relegation after the previous Nationalliga A season the club's priority aim was to return immediately to the top flight of Swiss football. Urs Siegenthaler was first-team coach for the second consecutive season. Due to the relegation there were many modifications in the squad. Ruedi Zahner retired from active football. Both goalkeeper moved on, Bernard Pulver to Young Boys and Urs Suter to Zürich. Stefan Bützer and Frank Eggeling both transferred to Emmenbrücke. Thomas Hauser and Varadaraju Sundramoorthy went to play for local rivals Old Boys. Dominique Herr moved on to Lausanne-Sport. The two forwards Adrian Knup transferred to Aarau and Peter Nadig to Luzern. Scottish ex-international Gordon Smith moved home to Scotland and joined Stirling Albion before ending his football career. Adrian Sedlo moved to Mulhouse and with four other players the contracts were not prolonged.

The club's financial problems had worsened during the previous season, this also due to the sinking number of spectators. But because an immediately to the top flight was the priority, 12 new players were signed in. Goalkeeper Remo Brügger was signed in from Luzern and his back up Roger Glanzmann from FC Therwil. The experienced players Andre Rindlisbacher transferred in from Aarau, Rolf Baumann from VfB Stuttgart, Mario Moscatelli from St. Gallen and Lucio Esposito from Luzern. There were a number of new players who joined from lower division clubs. For example Michael Syfrig, who had played a big role in the promotion of FC Glarus the previous season, signed in on his first professional contract. Then local youngsters Germano Fanciulli joined from local rivals Old Boys and Andre Cueni from FC Laufen. Further Beat Aebi came from FC Volketswil, Kurt Spirig came from Diepoldsau and Patrick Liniger was brought from the youth team.

Domestic league
The 24 teams in the Nationalliga B were divided into two groups, an east and a west group, to first play a qualification round. In the second stage the tops six teams in each group and the last four team of the Nationalliga A would play a promotion/relegation round, also divided into two groups. The top two teams in each group would next season play in the top flight. Basel were assigned to the East group. They ended their 22 matches in the Qualifying Phase with 14 victories, four draws and four defeats with 32 points. They were group winners. The team scored 48 goals and conceded just 23. In this first stage Lucio Esposito was the team's top goal scorer with 10 goals and Ralph Thoma second in the internal ranking with eight goals.

Thus Basel qualified themselves for a Promotion group. Basel were assigned to group A. Also qualified for this group from the Nationalliga B were Zürich, CS Chênois, Grenchen, ES Malley and the Old Boys. The team's goal scoring quality was missed during the Promotion stage. In the fifth, sixth and seventh round Basel lost the two away games against Lausanne-Sports 1–4 and St. Gallen 0–3, as well as the home match against local rivals Old Boys 0–1, therefore losing very valuable points. Basel ended the group with just 19 scored goals and just 14 obtained points in fourth position and thus they missed promotion. They were nine respectively eight points behind St. Gallen and Lausanne-Sports, both of whom were quite easily able to avoid relegation.

Swiss Cup
Basel entered into the Swiss Cup in the 2nd principal round. Here they were drawn away against local team Oberwil. The game was won easily, 5–0. In the next round Basel were drawn against higher classed Young Boys. Basel mastered their opponents well, winning 4–1. In the round of 32 and round of 16 Basel had two ties against lower tier teams winning both to qualify for the quarterfinals. Here their cup season game to an end because they lost against top-tier team Aarau. Grasshopper Club won the cup for the second season in a row, beating Aarau 2–1 in the final.

Players 

 

 

 

 

 

 
 
 
 

Players who left the squad

Results 

Legend

Friendly matches

Pre- and mid-season

Winter break and mid-season

Nationalliga B

Qualifying Phase East

League table

Promotion/relegation phase

League table

Swiss Cup

See also
 History of FC Basel
 List of FC Basel players
 List of FC Basel seasons

Sources and references

Sources and references
 Rotblau: Jahrbuch Saison 2015/2016. Publisher: FC Basel Marketing AG. 
 Die ersten 125 Jahre. Publisher: Josef Zindel im Friedrich Reinhardt Verlag, Basel. 
 The FCB squad 1988–89 at fcb-archiv.ch
 1988–89 at RSSSF

External links
 FC Basel official site

FC Basel seasons
Basel